Stryphnodendron adstringens is a species of legume in the genus Stryphnodendron found in Brazil.

Holcocera cerradicola is a moth, whose larvae feed on S. adstringens.

Chemistry
Stryphnodendron adstringens stem bark is used to produce tannins of the prorobinetinidins (flavanols oligomers containing robinetinidol) or prodelphinidins type. These are robinetinidol-(4β → 8)-epigallocatechin, robinetinidol-(4α → 8)-epigallocatechin, robinetinidol-(4β → 8)-epigallocatechin 3-O-gallate, robinetinidol-(4α → 8)-epigallocatechin 3-O-gallate, robinetinidol-(4α → 6)-gallocatechin and robinetinidol-(4α → 6)-epigallocatechin, in addition to the tentatively characterized, robinetinidol [4β → 6(8)]-gallocatechin and robinetinidol-(4α → 8)-gallocatechin.

References

External links

adstringens
Trees of Brazil